A.D. 2000  may refer to:

 A.D. 2000, the year 2000 of the Common Era
 AD 2000, a Catholic traditionalist magazine